is a Japanese actress and former singer.

Discography

Singles
[2005.02.23] 
[2005.03.30] 
[2005.07.27] 
[2005.11.09] "Thank You for Everything"

Albums
[2005.05.25] 
[2005.12.07] Thank You For...
[2008.06.04] Best +

DVDs
[2006.05.03] First Scene ~Sayuri Iwata 1st Visual Collection~

Book

Photobook
[2005.11.10] best friend

Filmography

TV shows
 Kisshoh Tennyo as Sayoko Kanou
 Jigoku Shoujo as Ai Enma
  as Hikari Ishikawa
 General Rouge no Gaisen as Kanae Mayama (Fuji TV, 2010) (ep5)

Movies
 Prince of Tennis (2006) as Shioin Higaki
  (2008)
  Kamen Rider Gaim Gaiden  (2015) as Touka Akatsuki/Kamen Rider Idunn

External links
Official Website
GIZA studio

Japanese women pop singers
Japanese female models
21st-century Japanese actresses
1990 births
Living people
Being Inc. artists
Place of birth missing (living people)
21st-century Japanese singers
21st-century Japanese women singers